Manfred Bock (28 May 1941 – 31 October 2010) was German track and field athlete who started for West Germany at the European Championship of 1962 and received the bronze medal in the Decathlon. He was born in Hamburg. In the 1960 Olympic Games, he took 10th place.

Manfred Bock was a member of the Hamburg SV. Bock died in October 2010 in Uetersen.

Tables
 1960 Olympic Games: (6894 points, 7006 points on the 1985 table: 11.4 s - 6.79 m - 12.03 m - 1.85 m - 50.5 s - 16.1 s - 37.69 s - 3.90 m - 63.63 m - 4:27.6 min)
 1962 European Championship:  (7835 points, 7565 on the 1985 table: 10.8 s - 6.96 m - 13.25 m - 1.86 m - 48.6 s - 14.7 s - 39.47 m - 3.90 m - 62.85 m - 4:22.9 min)

References

1941 births
2010 deaths
German decathletes
Athletes from Hamburg
Athletes (track and field) at the 1960 Summer Olympics
Olympic athletes of West Germany
People from Uetersen
European Athletics Championships medalists